William Martin Boucher (November 10, 1899 – November 10, 1958) was a Canadian professional ice hockey player. Boucher played in the National Hockey League (NHL) with the Hamilton Tigers, Montreal Canadiens, Boston Bruins and New York Americans from 1921 to 1928. With the Canadiens he won the Stanley Cup in 1924. His brothers Bobby,  Frank and Georges were also professional ice hockey players and all four were members of Stanley Cup championship teams.

Playing career
He played in the National Hockey League for the Hamilton Tigers, Montreal Canadiens, Boston Bruins and New York Americans. He also played for the New Haven Eagles and Bronx Tigers of the Canadian-American Hockey League. Boucher signed with the Canadiens in 1921, and scored 17 goals in his rookie season. Boucher scored 24 goals in 24 games in his second season. In his third season, 1923–24 Boucher was placed on a line with rookie Howie Morenz and Aurele Joliat in a high-scoring trio. Boucher led the Canadiens in scoring, and runner-up in the league. The team defeated defending champion Ottawa in the NHA playoffs and the Calgary Tigers in the Stanley Cup Final. When the team played its first game in the Montreal Forum in November 1924, Boucher scored the first goal in the facility, and the first hat trick. In the 1926–27 season, Boucher was loaned to the Boston Bruins before being traded to the New York Americans, where he finished his NHL career.

Personal life
Born in Ottawa, Ontario, Billy was one of six sons born to Tom Boucher and Annie Carroll: Billy, Bobby, Carroll, Frank, George and Joseph and two sisters, Irene and Lily. His paternal grandfather, Antoine Boucher was French while his other grandparents were of Irish descent. Tom Boucher played rugby football, winning the Canadian championship in 1894, 1896, 1897 and 1901 with teams in Ottawa. Boucher attended St. Joseph's Separate School in Ottawa. Boucher married Theresa Payette in 1921. They had two sons: E. William and Robert J., and daughter June.

After finishing with hockey, Boucher returned to Ottawa and worked for the Defence Department of the Canadian government. Boucher died of a heart attack on his 59th birthday, November 10, 1958. Boucher was buried in Notre Dame Cemetery in Ottawa.

Career statistics

Regular season and playoffs

References
 

Notes

External links 

Montreal Canadiens profile of Billy Boucher

1899 births
1958 deaths
Boston Bruins players
Bronx Tigers players
Canadian ice hockey right wingers
Montreal Canadiens players
New Haven Eagles players
New York Americans players
Ice hockey people from Ottawa
Stanley Cup champions